Cune Gojković may refer to:

 Predrag Gojković (1932–2017), Serbian singer
 Jovan Gojković (1975–2001), Serbian footballer